John Stainton is an Australian film and television producer and director. He was close friends with Australian naturalist Steve Irwin until his death in September 2006. Stainton also created Irwin's popular nature documentary television series, The Crocodile Hunter, in which he also directed and executive produced every episode (save for a few specials), as well as the spin-offs, Croc Files and The Crocodile Hunter Diaries, and the feature-film, The Crocodile Hunter: Collision Course.

Stainton was adamant in preventing the footage of Irwin's last moments, which depicts the moments after the stingray attack, from being publicly released, stating that "it should be destroyed". There were rumors that the footage had been leaked onto the internet, but all were revealed to be faked.

In the memorial service held on 20 September 2006 for Steve Irwin, Stainton made an appearance to pay tribute to his old friend.

Partial filmography
 Confessions of the Crocodile Hunter
 Tigers of Shark Bay
 Crocs in the City
 Search for a Super Croc
 Ice Breaker
 Island of Snakes
 Ocean's Deadliest
 Bindi the Jungle Girl
 The Crocodile Hunter: Collision Course
 The Crocodile Hunter Diaries
 The Crocodile Hunter's Croc Files
 The Crocodile Hunter
 Ghosts of War
 New Breed Vets
 "Your Worst Animal Nightmares"
 Crikey! What an Adventure
 In Steve's Footsteps
 My Daddy, the Crocodile Hunter

References

External links
 
 Steve Irwin digital story and oral history: Queensland Business Leaders Hall of Fame 2009, State Library of Queensland. Contains interview with Stainton about his relationship with Steven Irwin

Living people
Year of birth missing (living people)
Steve Irwin